Apollo Theatre or Apollo Theater may refer to:

United Kingdom
 Apollo Theatre, in the West End of London
 Apollo Victoria Theatre, in Victoria, London
 New Theatre Oxford, formerly known as the Apollo Theatre, in Oxford
 O2 Apollo Manchester, formerly known as the Manchester Apollo, in Manchester

United States
 Apollo Theater, in Harlem, New York City
 Apollo Theater Chicago
 Apollo Theatre (Oberlin, Ohio)
 Apollo Theatre (Martinsburg, West Virginia)
 Apollo Theater (Washington, DC), on H Street NE, now demolished
 Apollo Theatre (42nd Street), Midtown Manhattan, New York City, now demolished
 United Artists Theatre (Chicago), originally named the Apollo Theatre, now demolished

Other
 Apollo (Paris), France
 Apollo-Theater (Düsseldorf), Germany
 Apollo-Theater (Siegen), Germany
 Apollo Theatre (film) (Teatro Apolo), a 1950 Spanish musical film about Teatro Apolo (Madrid)
 Teatro Apolo (Madrid), now defunct cinema and subject of Apollo Theatre (film)
 Teatro Apollo Rome, vanished theater in Tor di Nona district
 Apollon Theater, Syros, Greece, opened in 1864

See also
 Hammersmith Apollo, an entertainment venue in Hammersmith, London, England, UK
 Apollo Cinemas, UK chain of cinemas
 The Apollo (Glasgow), a former music venue in Glasgow, Scotland, UK
 O2 Apollo Manchester, in Manchester, England, UK
 Coventry Apollo, in Coventry, England, now demolished
 :es:Teatro Apolo, another extensive list